J. Cole: Road to Homecoming is a 2015 mini-documentary series about American rapper J. Cole. The documentary series provides insight into the 2014 Forest Hills Drive album rollout, documents each act of the Forest Hills Drive Tour, and highlights of the 2015 Dollar & A Dream Tour.

Premise
On December 15, 2015, Cole announced the mini-series which gives an intimate look at his creative process and the inner workings of his career. Upon the premiere date, J. Cole wrote:

Release
The first four episodes of the mini-series were released weekly, and included behind-the-scenes footage of the album's creation, music videos, and backstage on the tour. Guest appearances included Kendrick Lamar, Wale, ASAP Ferg and Rihanna. The fifth episode aired on January 9, as the concert film, Forest Hills Drive: Homecoming, covering his 2015 show at the Crown Coliseum in Fayetteville, North Carolina. All episodes were available for free on Vimeo until January 9.

Episodes

References 

J. Cole
HBO documentary films
2010s American television miniseries
2015 American television series debuts
2016 American television series endings